The Mallard Song is an ancient tradition of All Souls' College, Oxford. It is sung every year at the Bursar's Dinner in March and the college's Gaudy in November and also sung in a separate special ceremony once a century.

The ceremony 
In the ceremony, Fellows parade around the college with flaming torches, led by a "Lord Mallard" who is carried in a chair, in search of a giant mallard that supposedly flew out of the foundations of the college when it was being built in 1437. The procession is led by an individual carrying a duck — originally dead, now just wooden — tied to the end of a vertical pole. The ceremony was last held in 2001, with Martin Litchfield West acting as Lord Mallard. His predecessor as Lord Mallard was Cosmo Lang, who presided over the centenary ceremony in 1901.

The song 

The words of the song are as follows:

The Griffine, Bustard, Turkey & Capon
Lett other hungry Mortalls gape on
And on theire bones with Stomacks fall hard,
But lett All Souls' Men have ye Mallard.

CHORUS:
Hough the bloud of King Edward,
By ye bloud of King Edward,
It was a swapping, swapping mallard!

Some storys strange are told I trow
By Baker, Holinshead & Stow
Of Cocks & Bulls, & other queire things
That happen'd in ye Reignes of theire Kings.

CHORUS

The Romans once admir'd a gander
More than they did theire best Commander,
Because hee saved, if some don't foolle us,
The place named from ye Scull of Tolus.

CHORUS

The Poets fain'd Jove turn'd a Swan,
But lett them prove it if they can.
To mak't appeare it's not att all hard:
Hee was a swapping, swapping mallard.

CHORUS

Hee was swapping all from bill to eye,
Hee was swapping all from wing to thigh;
His swapping tool of generation
Oute swapped all ye wingged Nation.

CHORUS

Then lett us drink and dance a Galliard
in ye Remembrance of ye Mallard,
And as ye Mallard doth in Poole,
Let's dabble, dive & duck in Boule.

CHORUS

Notes

The word "swapping", repeatedly used in the chorus, is a now-obsolete use from Middle English meaning "striking" (as in "what a remarkably big duck that is!").

The identity of King Edward in the song is not known; it could refer to any of the five English monarchs of that name (three numbered, and two earlier monarchs) up to the time the song was created.

The reference to "Jove turn'd a Swan" refers to the mythical incident in which the Roman god Jupiter transformed himself into a swan to seduce Queen Leda.

Not surprisingly, the Victorians disapproved of the reference to the mallard's "swapping tool of generation", mightier than any other in "ye wingged Nation" (of birds). They dropped this verse from the song, but to the delight of traditionalists, it was restored in the 2001 ceremony.

The last two lines are an invitation to the singers to retire to a convenient watering-hole. They could be paraphrased as saying "in much the same way as the Mallard dives into a pond, let us dive into a drinking bowl."

The centenary ceremony is parodied in Sir Terry Pratchett's novel Unseen Academicals as "the Chasing of the Megapode", practiced once a century by the wizards of the Unseen University in Ankh-Morpork. Similar to the Oxonian ceremony, one member of staff is elected to perform a special role during the ceremony, which, however, is not to preside over the proceedings but to personify the mythical bird megapode itself and be chased by the other wizards. In the ceremony described in the novel, the megapode is played by Professor Rincewind, the Chair of Cruel and Unusual Geography.

Folk Song
A folksong (Roud 1517) found in southern England is an accumulative song about the body of the mallard.

References

External links

English folk songs
All Souls College, Oxford
English folklore
Music in Oxford
Culture of the University of Oxford